The University of Alberta Faculty of Extension, founded in 1912, is located in the historic Enterprise Square building in downtown Edmonton, Alberta, Canada.  The University of Alberta Faculty of Extension is a faculty of the University of Alberta and places heavy focus on research and community engagement, including continuing education and professional development.

History

The First Decade (1912 - 1922)
The University of Alberta established the Department of Extension in 1912 giving it the mandate of "carrying the University to the people."  With this mindset, A.E. Ottewell was appointed the first Director for the Department of Extension.

When the Department of Extension was first founded, Alberta had a mostly-rural population of 375,000 people that was widely spread throughout the province.  To meet the needs of the community, the Department of Extension began to offer conferences on rural leadership.  It also delivered over 100 lectures each year, and staff members would travel thousands of miles by train, car, and horse to present these lectures.

Two other early and popular initiatives were the Extension Library and the Magic Lantern service.

The Extension Library began in 1913, and boxes of books were available to any settlement in Alberta, providing literature to communities that otherwise would be without.  Scripts for drama productions and "package libraries" focusing on one area for debate teams were also available in the Extension Library.  The Extension Library operated from 1913 until 1987.

The Magic Lantern service began as slideshow programs on a wide variety of subjects.  In 1917, the Magic Lantern service became the first educational film library in Canada, after securing a $4,000 grant from the Goodyear Tire and Rubber Company.  Over the next several decades, the Magic Lantern service offered both slideshow and film presentations.

The 1920s, 1930s, and 1940s
Between 1920 and 1950, the Department of Extension continued to focus on serving the agricultural, educational, and cultural needs of rural Alberta.  One way of reaching great distances effectively was radio.  In 1925, a series of lectures began to air on CJCA.  Three years later, in 1928, the Faculty of Extension founded CKUA.

The Department of Extension was also the catalyst for the founding of the Banff School of Fine Arts, known today as The Banff Centre, with the first classes being held in 1934.

In 1940, "refresher" courses were offered to municipal administrators, and the success of these courses resulted in the formation of similar courses through the 1940s.  During the 1940s there was also a large growth in classes and lectures offered in Edmonton and Calgary.  The first Inter-University Drama Festival and the Western Board of Music were also both founded during this time.

The 1950s, 1960, and 1970s
The 1950s introduced a period of intense industrialization in Alberta, due largely to the discovery of the oil field Leduc, Alberta.  In 1950, the first "mud school" was established in a partnership between the University of Alberta Department of Extension, the University of Alberta's Department of Chemical and Petroleum Engineering, and several associations within the oil industry (this program would eventually become the Petroleum Industry Training Service).

The success of the "mud schools" led to an increase in the development of non-credit courses, classes, seminars, and conferences.  These diverse course selections were offered in Edmonton, Calgary, Red Deer, and Lethbridge.  The diverse course selection led to a growing interest for a credentialed program, and in 1957, the Certificate in Social Welfare became the first of many Certificate programs offered by the Department of Extension.

As the oil boom continued in the 1970s, the Department of Extension offered courses in Fort McMurray, Inuvik, Yellowknife, Hinton, and Edmonton.

In 1973, English as a second language began to be offered through the Department of Extension.

On November 1, 1975, the Department of Extension was granted full faculty status by the University of Alberta, becoming the Faculty of Extension.

The 1980s and 1990s
The 1980s continued to see large increases in enrollment.  By 1980/81, there were over 35,423 students enrolled in the Faculty of Extension's certificate programs, citation program, home study courses, and other courses available in fine arts and liberal studies.  Throughout the next two decades, the number and diversity of courses offered continued to grow.

In 1999, the Master of Arts in Communications and Technology was established, becoming the first master's program offered by the Faculty of Extension.

The 2000s to present
The 2000s continued to be a period of growth for the Faculty of Extension.  In 2003, the first Information Access and Privacy Conference was held, and has since been an annual event.

In 2006, the City-Regions Studies Centre was established.

After being located on the University of Alberta's main campus since its founding, in 2007, the Faculty of Extension moved into the renovated and historic Enterprise Square.   Also in 2007, the Faculty of Extension hosted the 54th annual Canadian Association of University Continuing Education (CAUCE) Conference.

Academic Studies
The University of Alberta Faculty of Extension offers general interest courses, topic seminars, industry designations, Certificate programs, Citation programs, as well as one Graduate Degree program.  Additionally, customized corporate training and English Language programs are also offered through the Faculty of Extension.

Diploma Programs
 Full-Stack Web Development
 Occupational Health & Safety
 Supply Management Training

Certificate Programs
 Applied Land Use Planning
 Business Analysis
 C# Back End Web Development
 Construction Administration and Management
 Digital Marketing
 Environmental Remediation
 Front End Web Development
 Human Resource Management
 Information Access and Protection of Privacy
 Land Reclamation
 Leadership (Advanced Certificate)
 Management Development
 Management Development for Police Services
 National Advanced Certificate in Local Authority Administration – Parts I & II (NACLAA)
 Occupational Health & Safety
 Python Back End Web Development
 Residential Interiors
 Renewable Energy Technologies
 Social Media
 Soil Science
 UX / UI Design
 Water Resource Management
 Wind Energy Development and Design

Citation Programs
 Applied Geostatistics
 Global Leadership (Advanced Citation)
 Supervisory Development

Series
 Analytics for Business
 Business Strategy
 Change Management
 Editing & Proofreading 
 Information Technology for Business Improvement
 Managing Organizational Risk
 Planning for Diverse Environments
 Project Management 
 Renewable Energy Essentials
 Solar Energy Development and Design
 Workplace Wellness Leadership

Designations
 Certified Administrative Professional 
 Certified in Management
 Risk and Insurance Management (CRM)

Microcredentials
 Blockchain Fundamentals
 Construction Estimating & Planning
 Data Privacy and Security
 Digital Marketing for Business
 Entrepreneurship and New Venture Development
 Technology in Logistics and Distribution Management

Course Collections
 Business Seminars
 Environmental Sciences
 OHS Emerging Issues
 Professional Education for Executives
 Sign Language
 SkillUp@UA (On-demand courses)
 Spanish
 Technology & Innovation
 Visual Arts
 World Languages
 Writing & Communications

English Language School
The English Language School is a unit that houses several English-language related programs. The English Language School helps international students meet the English language requirements for undergraduate admission at the University of Alberta.

References

External links
 University of Alberta Faculty of Extension
 University of Alberta
 Access and Privacy Conference
 Enterprise Square

University of Alberta
Educational institutions established in 1912
1912 establishments in Alberta